Byzantine silk is silk woven in the Byzantine Empire (Byzantium) from about the fourth century until the Fall of Constantinople in 1453.

The Byzantine capital of Constantinople was the first significant silk-weaving center in Europe. Silk was one of the most important commodities in the Byzantine economy, used by the state both as a means of payment and of diplomacy.

Raw silk was bought from China and made up into fine fabrics that commanded high prices throughout the world. Later, silkworms were smuggled into the Empire and the overland silk trade gradually became less important. After the reign of Justinian I, the manufacture and sale of silk became an imperial monopoly, only processed in imperial factories, and sold to authorized buyers.

Byzantine silks are significant for their brilliant colours, use of gold thread, and intricate designs that approach the pictorial complexity of embroidery in loom-woven fabric. Byzantium dominated silk production in Europe throughout the Early Middle Ages, until the establishment of the Italian silk-weaving industry in the 12th century and the conquest and break-up of the Byzantine Empire in the Fourth Crusade (1204).

Development

In the time of the Roman Empire, silk textiles reached the West overland via the Silk Road across Asia from Han China, passing through the Parthian Empire and later Sassanid Empire to trading centers in Syria. Imports of raw silk, silk yarn, and finished fabrics are all recorded, but the techniques of producing these textiles from the silkworm Bombyx mori remained a closely guarded secret of the Chinese until the Emperor of the East Justinian I (482–565) arranged to have silkworm eggs smuggled out of Central Asia in 553-54, setting the stage for the flowering of the Byzantine silk-weaving industry.

Shortly after the smuggling of silkworm eggs from China by Nestorian Christian monks, the 6th-century Byzantine historian Menander Protector writes of how the Sogdians attempted to establish a direct trade of Chinese silk with the Byzantine Empire. After forming an alliance with the Sasanian ruler Khosrow I to defeat the Hephthalite Empire, Istämi, the Göktürk ruler of the Turkic Khaganate, was approached by Sogdian merchants requesting permission to seek an audience with the Sassanid king of kings for the privilege of traveling through Persian territories in order to trade with the Byzantines. Istämi refused the first request, but when he sanctioned the second one and had the Sogdian embassy sent to the Sassanid king, the latter had the members of the embassy poisoned to death. Maniah, a Sogdian diplomat, convinced Istämi to send an embassy directly to Constantinople, which arrived in 568 and offered not only silk as a gift to Byzantine ruler Justin II, but also proposed an alliance against Sassanid Persia. Justin II agreed and sent an embassy to the Turkic Khaganate, ensuring the direct silk trade desired by the Sogdians. However, even with the Byzantine production of silk starting in the 6th century, Chinese varieties were still considered of better quality, a fact that is perhaps underscored by the discovery of a Byzantine solidus coin minted during the reign of Justin II found in a Sui dynasty (581-618 AD) Chinese tomb of Shaanxi province in 1953, among other Byzantine coins found at various sites. According to Chinese histories, the Byzantines (i.e. "Fu-lin"), maintaining an earlier Roman diplomatic tradition in China, also sent several embassies to the court of the Chinese Tang dynasty (618-907 AD) and on one occasion to that of the Song dynasty (960-1279), offering exotic gifts such as glasswares while demonstrating a continual interest in the Chinese silk trade. The 7th-century Byzantine historian Theophylact Simocatta provided a fairly accurate depiction of China, its geography, its reunification by the Sui dynasty (581-618), and even named its ruler Taisson as meaning "Son of God", perhaps also derived from the name Emperor Taizong of Tang (r. 626-649). Contemporary Chinese sources, namely the Old and New Book of Tang, also depicted the city of Constantinople and how it was besieged by Muawiyah I (founder of the Umayyad Caliphate), who exacted tribute afterwards.

New types of looms and weaving techniques also played a part. Plain-woven or tabby silks had circulated in the Roman world, and patterned damask silks in increasingly complex geometric designs appear from the mid-3rd century. Weft-faced compound twills were developed not later than 600, and polychrome (multicoloured) compound twills became the standard weave for Byzantine silks for the next several centuries. Monochrome lampas weaves became fashionable around 1000 in both Byzantine and Islamic weaving centres; these fabrics rely on contrasting textures rather than colour to render patterns.  A small number of tapestry-woven Byzantine silks also survive.

Regulations governing the use of expensive Tyrian purple dyestuffs varied over the years, but cloth dyed in these colours was generally restricted to specific classes and was used in diplomatic gifts. Other dyes used in Byzantine silk workshops were madder, kermes, indigo, weld, and sappanwood. Gold thread was made with silver-gilt strips wrapped around a silk core.

Figured (patterned) Byzantine silks of the 6th (and possibly 5th) centuries show overall designs of small motifs such as hearts, swastikas, palmettes and leaves worked in two weft colours. Later, recognizable plant motifs (such as lotus leaves and flowers) and human figures appear. Surviving textiles document a rich exchange of techniques and iconographic themes between Constantinople and the newly-Islamic textile centres of the Mediterranean and Central Asia in the years after the Muslim conquests of the 7th century. Designs of the 8th and 9th centuries show rows of roundels or medallions populated with pairs of human or animal figures reversed in mirror-image on a vertical axis.  Many motifs echo Sassanian designs including the tree of life, winged horses, lions, and imaginary beasts, and there are numbers of surviving pieces where specialists cannot agree between a Byzantine or Islamic origin. Fashionable patterns evoked the activities and interests of the royal court, such as hunting scenes or the quadriga (four-horse chariot).

Woven textiles

Of the five basic weaves used in Byzantium and the Islamic weaving centers of the Mediterranean – tabby, twill, damask, lampas and tapestry – the most important product was the weft-faced compound twill called samite. The word is derived from Old French samit, from medieval Latin samitum, examitum deriving from the Byzantine Greek  ἑξάμιτον hexamiton "six threads", usually interpreted as indicating the use of six yarns in the warp. In samite, the main warp threads are hidden on both sides of the fabric by the ground and patterning wefts, with only the binding warps that hold the wefts in place visible.

These rich silks – literally worth their weight in gold – were powerful political weapons of the Byzantine Empire between the 4th and 12th centuries. Diplomatic gifts of Byzantine silks cemented alliances with the Franks. Byzantium granted silk-trading concessions to the sea powers of Venice, Pisa, Genoa and Amalfi to secure naval and military aid for Byzantine territories.

The influence exerted by Byzantine silk weaving was profound. Byzantine silk court ritual and ecclesiastical practices were adopted by the Franks, just as Byzantine court furnishing styles and dress codes were echoed across the Islamic world. Byzantium developed elaborate silk court attire and set the style for use of silk in civil and military uniforms and for rich religious vestments.... These silks served as a form of portable wealth that could be profitably disposed of in times of need.

Silks survive in Western Europe from the graves of important figures, used in book bindings, and also reliquaries. But it is clear they had a number of uses as hangings and drapes in churches and the houses of the wealthy, as well as for clothing and vestments. The sources rarely mention the specific origin of silks, but sometimes describe the designs in enough detail to allow an identification as Byzantine.

Anglo-Saxon England had silks from at least the late 7th century, brought back from Rome by Benedict Biscop and others.  They were an essential, and easily carried, purchase for well-off pilgrims to Rome or the Holy Land (where Syrian or Egyptian silk might also be bought), and were available in England from English traders who certainly had bases in Rome and Pavia, and probably also bought from Scandinavian traders using the Baltic route. A unique special arrangement had to be made whereby the English crown paid directly a sum to Pavia in lieu of the customs duty on silk, which the Pavians found too difficult or dangerous to collect from English merchants. Diplomatic gifts also cascaded down from the Imperial court in Constantinople, with the rulers who received them passing many on to other rulers, and churches both in and outside their territory. Charlemagne gave not only King Offa of Mercia silks, but also the dioceses of Mercia and Northumbria.

Tapestry and embroidery

In addition to woven dress and furnishing fabrics, Byzantine workshops were also known for woven tapestries and richly embroidered textiles with decoration that often included figurative scenes. The most impressive example to survive is the 10th century "Bamberger Gunthertuch", a woven tapestry piece over two metres square, with a mounted emperor between two female personifications. Nearly a century after it was made it was acquired by the Bishop of Bamberg in Germany, on a pilgrimage to Constantinople. He died during the journey and it was used for his shroud. Embroidered religious scenes were also used for vestments and hangings, and the famous English Opus Anglicanum seems to have been heavily influenced by Byzantine embroidery. This continued Late Antique trends, which among other evidence are known from finds in Egyptian cemeteries, and the complaint by Saint Asterius of Amasia in around 410 about his flock in northeastern Turkey, where he says the laity decorated their clothes with religious images:
... they artfully produce, both for themselves and for their wives and children, clothing beflowered and wrought with ten thousand objects....When, therefore, they dress themselves and appear in public, they look like pictured walls in the eyes of those that meet them. And perhaps even the children surround them, smiling to one another and pointing out with the finger the picture on the garment; and walk along after them, following them for a long time. On these garments are lions and leopards; bears and bulls and dogs; woods and rocks and hunters ... You may see the wedding of Galilee, and the water-pots; the paralytic carrying his bed on his shoulders; the blind man being healed with the clay; the woman with the bloody issue, taking hold of the border of the garment; the sinful woman falling at the feet of Jesus; Lazarus returning to life from the grave. In doing this they consider that they are acting piously and are clad in garments pleasing to God. But if they take my advice let them sell those clothes and honour the living image of God. Do not picture Christ on your garments. It is enough that he once suffered the humiliation of dwelling in a human body which of his own accord he assumed for our sakes. So, not upon your robes but upon your soul carry about his image.

The Egyptian cemetery examples are usually in less fine textiles than silk, and are typically roundels or other simple shapes with a border and a scene inside. This style of design seems not dissimilar to mentions and the few survivals of religious embroidery from the West many centuries later. Some Western embroidery was imported, other pieces no doubt done locally on imported silk, though other materials were used. The only survival of such work on the largest scale, the enormous Bayeux Tapestry (incomplete at 0.5 by 68.38 metres or 1.6 by 224.3 ft) is wool embroidered on a plain linen background, and not technically a tapestry at all. However smaller scale figurative hangings and clothes in silk are mentioned.

Decline
In 1147, during the Second Crusade, Roger II of Sicily (1095–1154) attacked Corinth and Thebes, two important centres of Byzantine silk production, capturing the weavers and their equipment and establishing his own silkworks in Palermo and Calabria. After the capture of Constantinople in 1204 by the forces of the Fourth Crusade (1202–1204) and the establishment of the Latin Empire (1204–1261) and other "Latin" states in the Byzantine territories, the Byzantine silk industry contracted, supplying only the domestic luxury market, and leadership in European silk-weaving and design passed to Sicily and the emerging Italian centres of Lucca and Venice.

See also 
 Byzantine art
 Byzantine dress
 Coptic textiles
 Persian embroidery
 Sampul tapestry
 Sichuan embroidery
 Sogdian textiles

Notes

References
 Burnham, Dorothy K. (1980) Warp and Weft, A Textile Terminology, Royal Ontario Museum, .
 Dodwell, C.R. (1982) Anglo-Saxon Art, A New Perspective, Manchester UP,  (US edn. Cornell, 1985)
 Feltham, Heleanor B. (2009) Justinian and the International Silk Trade, in: Sino-Platonic Papers, No.: 194 (2009).
 Hoffman, Eva R. (2007): Pathways of Portability: Islamic and Christian Interchange from the Tenth to the Twelfth Century, in: Hoffman, Eva R. (ed.): Late Antique and Medieval Art of the Mediterranean World, Blackwell Publishing, 
 Jenkins, David, ed. (2003) The Cambridge History of Western Textiles, Cambridge University Press, .
 Mannas, Lisa (2008) Merchants, Princes and Painters: Silk Fabrics in Northern and Italian Paintings 1300–1550, Appendix I:III "Medieval Silk Fabric Types and Weaves", Yale University Press, 
 Laiou, Angeliki E., ed. (2002), The Economic History of Byzantium: From the Seventh through the Fifteenth Century, Dumbarton Oaks.
 Schoeser, Mary. (2007) Silk, Yale University Press, .

External links

The glory of Byzantium: Art and Culture of the Middle Byzantine Era, A.D. 843-1261, an exhibition catalog from The Metropolitan Museum of Art (fully available online as PDF), which contains material on Byzantine silk

Silk
Medieval textile design
Silk
Textile arts of Greece
Byzantine clothing